Picacho Peak State Park is a state park surrounding Picacho Peak in Picacho, Arizona. The park is located between Casa Grande and Tucson near Interstate 10 in Pinal County. Though appearing to be the remnant of a volcanic neck, it is now believed to be a tilted and eroded piece of rock overlain by a lava flow.

Name
The place name Picacho Peak is etymologically redundant: picacho means 'peak' in Spanish. In 1775 the peak was referred to as Cerro de Taca 'Taca Hill' by Father Francisco Garcés, using the Oʼodham name Tcacca or Taceo. It was also called Picacho del Tucson 'Tucson Peak' in the past.

Description
The park is celebrated for wildflowers that appear mid-February to early April following good winter rain.  Though set next to an interstate highway, the park's west face possesses an unspoiled Sonoran Desert setting.  A small flat space on top of the spire can be reached via two trail heads.  Portions of the trails are precarious, and hikers are aided by cables and catwalks.  These additions make the routes some of the few via ferrata in the United States. From the top, there is a view south to the Santa Catalina Mountains near Tucson, east across Interstate 10 to Newman Peak, northwest to Tabletop Mountain near Casa Grande, north to the many mountain ranges surrounding Phoenix, and west to where the north-running Santa Cruz River runs underground supporting farms in a quaint desert valley.

Park rangers recommend that hikers wear sturdy boots and carry two liters of water per person. Gloves are commonly used to help grip the cables.

History
The Butterfield Overland Mail route had a stop near Picacho Peak. The park is near the site of the Battle of Picacho Pass, one of several American Civil War era engagements to occur in Arizona Territory. A Union cavalry patrol from California skirmished with Confederate scouts from Texas, and three men were killed. This marks the second westernmost battle of the American Civil War. Every year during early March, there are reenactments of the battle and other demonstrations of Civil War military history.

Appearances in fiction
Picacho Peak features prominently in the novel The Host by Stephenie Meyer, serving as a guide to the main character in the first act of the story.  Much of the action of the novel takes place in or near the state park.

Gallery

See also

 Red Rock, Pinal County, Arizona
 Sasco, Arizona

References

External links

Picacho Peak State Park

1965 establishments in Arizona
Parks in Pinal County, Arizona
Protected areas established in 1965
Sonoran Desert
State parks of Arizona
American Civil War on the National Register of Historic Places
Stagecoach stations on the National Register of Historic Places
Conflict sites on National Register of Historic Places in Arizona
Transportation buildings and structures on the National Register of Historic Places in Arizona